Hand with Reflecting Sphere, also known as Self-Portrait in Spherical Mirror, is a  lithograph by  Dutch  artist  M. C. Escher, first printed in January 1935. The piece depicts a hand holding a reflective  sphere. In the reflection, most of the room around Escher can be seen, and the hand holding the sphere is revealed to be Escher's.
                                                                                               
Self-portraits in reflective, spherical surfaces are common in Escher's work, and this image is the most prominent and famous example. In much of his self-portraiture of this type, Escher is in the act of drawing the sphere, whereas in this image he is seated and gazing into it. On the walls there are several framed pictures, one of which appears to be of an Indonesian shadow puppet.

See also
 Still Life with Spherical Mirror
 Three Spheres II
 Lithography

Sources
Locher, J.L. (2000). The Magic of M. C. Escher. Harry N. Abrams, Inc. .

Works by M. C. Escher
1935 paintings
Self-portraits
Mirrors in art